International Colour Day is an annual event held on March 21 to celebrate colour.

The day was established by the International Colour Association (abbreviated as AIC for its French name), which is composed of national colour organizations and members representing over 30 countries.

Background
The adoption of a worldwide day of colour was first proposed in 2008 by the Portuguese Color Association, whose president, Maria Joao Durao, presented the idea to the International Colour Association (abbreviated as AIC for its French name). The proposal was agreed upon in 2009 among the members of the AIC, which is composed of national colour organizations and members representing over 30 countries.

International Colour Day was thereby established, with the 21st of March adopted as the official date. This date was chosen because it is around the equinox, when "the sun shines directly on the equator," and thus, the duration of day and night are approximately equal in length around the world.

Logo
An international competition for the design of the International Colour Day logo was held at the 2012 interim meeting of the International Colour Association, held in Taipei, Taiwan. As expressed by winning designer Hosanna Yau of Hong Kong, "two circles form an eye, with an equal half of rainbow color and black representing light and darkness, day and night, everyone feast one's eye on the international color day."

Activities
Some of the activities and events that are unfolded on the International Colour Day: 
 Arts exhibitions, architectural projects, design, decoration, fashion
 Meetings, debates, scientific events
 Workshops on the use of colour and light for both adults and children.
 Contests on colour and light design.
 Wearing national or regional identity colours.
AIC member countries:
 Australia — Colour Society of Australia
Belgium — Interdisciplinary Colour Association Belgium
 Brazil — Associação ProCor do Brasil
 Canada — Colour Research Society of Canada
Chile — Asociación del Color Chile
 Croatia — Croatian Color Society in co-organization with the University of Zagreb
Finland — Finnish Colour Association
France — Centre Français de la Couleur
Hungary — Hungarian National Colour Committee 
Italy — Gruppo del Colore – Associazione Italiana Colore
Japan — Color Science Association of Japan
Korea — Korean Society of Color Studies
The Netherlands — Kleurenvisie
Norway — FORUM FARGE
Portugal — Portuguese Colour Association
Russia — Color Society of Russia
Slovenia — Slovenian Society for Colours
Spain — Faculty of Sciences of the University of Alicante
Sweden — Swedish Colour Centre Foundation
Taiwan — Color Association of Taiwan
United Kingdom — The Colour Group
 United States — Inter-Society Color Council

See also 

 International Colour Association
 Inter-Society Color Council
 The Colour Group

References

External links 

 Official website of the International Colour Association
 About the ICD (in Spanish)

Color organizations
Color
March observances